The Philippines competed at the 1932 Summer Olympics in Los Angeles, United States. Until the 2020 Olympics, this was the first and only games where Filipinos won more than one medal and also earned its highest medal haul.

Medalists

Results by event

Athletics
Field events

Boxing

Swimming
Men

References
Philippine Sports Commission
Official Olympic Reports
International Olympic Committee results database
Olympics Philippine History

Nations at the 1932 Summer Olympics
1932
Summer Olympics